The Professorship of Zoology is a professorship at the University of Cambridge. Founded in 1866 it was originally the 'Professorship of Zoology and Comparative Anatomy', but was renamed in 1934. The title has also been used for single-tenure professorships.

Professors of Zoology (1866)
 Alfred Newton (1866)
 Adam Sedgwick (1907)
 John Stanley Gardiner (1909)
 James Gray (1937)
 Carl Frederick Abel Pantin (1959)
 Torkel Weis-Fogh (1966-1975)
 Gabriel Horn (1978)
 Malcolm Burrows (1996)
 Michael Akam (2010)

Professors of Zoology (single-tenure creations)
 Michael Akam (1997–2010)
 Paul Brakefield (2010–)

See also
List of professorships at the University of Cambridge

References

Zoology
Faculty of Biology, University of Cambridge
1866 establishments in England
Zoology, *, Cambridge